This is the discography for American jazz musician Dinah Washington.

As leader

 1947: Mellow Mama (Delmark [1992]) compilation of Apollo recordings
 1950: Dinah Washington (MG-25060) (compilation of previous 78s)
 1952: Dynamic Dinah! - The Great Voice of Dinah Washington (compilation of previous 78s)
 1952: Blazing Ballads (Compilation)
 1954: After Hours with Miss "D"
 1954: Dinah Jams
 1955: For Those in Love
 1956: Dinah!
 1956: In the Land of Hi-Fi
 1957: The Swingin' Miss "D"
 1957: Dinah Washington Sings Fats Waller
 1957: Music for a First Love
 1958: Dinah Sings Bessie Smith
 1958: Newport '58
 1959:  The Queen 
 1959: What a Diff'rence a Day Makes!
 1959: Unforgettable
 1960: The Two of Us (with Brook Benton)
 1960:  I Concentrate on You 
 1960: For Lonely Lovers
 1961: September in the Rain
 1962: Dinah '62
 1962: In Love
 1962: Drinking Again
 1962: Tears and Laughter
 1962: I Wanna Be Loved
 1962: Late, Late Show
 1963: Back to the Blues
 1963: Dinah '63
 1963: This Is My Story
 1964: In Tribute
 1964: The World of Dinah Washington (SR-25269) (Compilation)
 1967: Dinah Discovered
 2004: The Complete Dinah Washington on Mercury (7 x 3-CDs, PolyGram, 1987–1989)
 2004: The Complete Roulette Dinah Washington Sessions  (5-CDs, Mosaic Records)

As sidewoman 

With Clifford Brown
 Jam Session (EmArcy, 1954) – with Maynard Ferguson and Clark Terry – appears on one track

Singles 

 "September in the Rain", "Tears and Laughter" and "Where Are You" also made the AC charts (nos. 5, 17 and 11 respectively)

References

External links

Discographies of American artists
Jazz discographies
Pop music discographies
Rhythm and blues discographies